The 2018 JLT One-Day Cup was the 50th season of the official List A domestic cricket competition in Australia. It was played over a four-week period at the start of the domestic season to separate its schedule from the Sheffield Shield season. The tournament was held in Townsville, Sydney, Perth and Melbourne. Fox Cricket broadcast 13 matches from the tournament. The tournament was sponsored by Jardine Lloyd Thompson.

Points table

RESULT POINTS:

 Win – 4
 Tie – 2 each
 No Result – 2 each
 Loss – 0
 Bonus Point – 1 (Run rate 1.25 times that of opposition.)
 Additional Bonus Point – 1 (Run rate twice that of opposition.)

Squads
The following squads were named:

New South Wales captain Peter Nevill was ruled out of the tournament after suffering a broken thumb while batting in the nets at the WACA Ground prior to the start of the Blues' campaign. He was replaced in the squad by Jay Lenton, while Kurtis Patterson assumed captaincy duties.

Tasmanian all-rounder James Faulkner sustained a calf injury whilst playing for Lancashire Lightning in the semi-final of England's domestic T20 competition. He was replaced in the squad by Gurinder Sandhu.

South Australia's Daniel Worrall sustained a back injury and was replaced by allrounder Luke Robins in the squad prior to the tournament.

Simon Mackin, Will Bosisto and Sam Whiteman were added to the Western Australian squad after D'Arcy Short, Marcus Stoinis and Matt Kelly were ruled out for the start of the tournament through injury.

Queenslander Jimmy Peirson made an early recovery from his injury and joined their squad prior to the match against Tasmania.

Chris Green and Ben Dwarshuis were added to the New South Wales squad in place of Jason Sangha and Trent Copeland prior to their clash with Tasmania, to allow the latter two to play Grade Cricket.

Wicket keeper Peter Nevill returned to the New South Wales squad after making a quick recovery from a broken thumb. He replaced fellow wicket keeper Jay Lenton.

Pat Cummins was added to the New South Wales squad after recovering from a back injury.

Debutants
The following players made their List A debuts throughout the competition.

League stage

Play-offs

Bracket

Qualifying Finals

Semi-finals

Final

Statistics

Most Runs

Most wickets

References

JLT One-Day Cup
Australian domestic limited-overs cricket tournament seasons
JLT One-Day Cup